Swan boat(s) may refer to:

Swan boat (racing), a type of boat originating in Thailand
Swan Boats (Boston, Massachusetts), a cultural icon of that city
Swan Boats (Magic Kingdom), a former ride at Magic Kingdom